para-Methoxyethylamphetamine (PMEA), is a stimulant drug related to PMA. PMEA reputedly produces similar effects to PMA, but is considerably less potent and seems to have slightly less tendency to produce severe hyperthermia, at least at low doses. At higher doses however the side effects and danger of death approach those of PMA itself, and PMEA should still be considered a potentially dangerous drug. Investigation of a drug-related death in Japan in 2005 showed PMEA to be present in the body and was thought to be responsible for the death.

See also 
 3-Fluoroethamphetamine
 3,4-Methylenedioxyethamphetamine
 Fenfluramine

References 

Substituted amphetamines
Monoamine oxidase inhibitors
Designer drugs
Serotonin releasing agents